Kent Broadhurst (born February 4, 1940) is an American actor, playwright, screenwriter and painter.

He has appeared in a number of off-Broadway and regional theater productions. Broadhurst has also acted in films, including The Verdict, Silkwood, and Silver Bullet, and in television productions including Babylon 5, Law & Order, War and Remembrance, and Kane and Abel.

His credits as a playwright include They're Coming To Make It Brighter, Lemons, The Eye of the Beholder, and The Habitual Acceptance of the Near Enough, all first produced at the Humana Festival at the Actors Theatre of Louisville. He wrote the screenplay for the 2001 television film Wild Iris.

Broadhurst was born in St. Louis, Missouri. He graduated from the University of Nebraska in 1962, and now lives in New York.

Gallery 
Examples of Broadhurst's work as a painter:

Filmography

References

External links

Kent Broadhurst at the Internet Off-Broadway Database

1940 births
American male stage actors
American male television actors
Living people
Male actors from St. Louis
20th-century American dramatists and playwrights
University of Nebraska alumni